4-Aminoacetanilide or paracetamin is a chemical compound which is a amino derivative of acetanilide and para-isomer of aminoacetanilide.  There are two other isomers of aminoacetanilide, 2-aminoacetanilide and 3-aminoacetanilide. Aminoacetanilide derivatives are important synthetic intermediates in heterocyclic and aromatic synthesis.  These derivatives have found applications in pharmaceutical industry and dyes and pigment industry.

Synthesis 
Becillus cereus converts 4-phenylenediamine to 4-aminoacetanilide. Reduction of 4-nitroacetanilide by hydrogenation catalyst generates 4-aminoacetanilide. Green synthesis of p-Aminoacetanilide is achieved by reducing p-nitroaetanilide using Zn/NH4Cl in water. Number of methods are available to reduce 4-nitroacetanilide using different catalyst and reaction conditions.

Uses 
4-Aminoacetanilide is used as in intermediate in the production of some dyes. 4-aminoacetanilide is also used for the synthesis of beta-lactams.

References 

Acetanilides
Anilines